Salford is a city in the City of Salford Metropolitan Borough, Greater Manchester, England. The city, which includes the suburbs of Broughton, Charlestown, Kersal, Ordsall, Pendleton, and Weaste, contains 129 listed buildings that are recorded in the National Heritage List for England. Of these, two are listed at Grade I, the highest of the three grades, nine are at Grade II*, the middle grade, and the others are at Grade II, the lowest grade.

Although Salford was a manor recorded in the Domesday Book, few listed buildings date from before the arrival of the Industrial Revolution in the form of the textile industry. There was a considerable increase in population in the early 19th century, particularly following the arrival of the railways, and many houses date from between 1830 and 1850, and these were followed by churches and public buildings.  The earliest listed buildings are a country house, a manor house and a church. In the early 19th century are a public house, churches and a bridge. Following that are houses, more churches, and a surviving mill; then there are more houses and associated structures, churches and items in churchyards, and public buildings. Other later types of listed buildings include railway structures, memorials and statues, social clubs, offices, a telephone kiosk, and items of public art.


Key

Buildings

References

Citations

Sources

Lists of listed buildings in Greater Manchester
Listed